Sajmir Gjokeja (born 31 March 1985) is an Albanian footballer who currently plays as an offensive midfielder for Iliria Fushë-Krujë in the Albanian First Division.

References

External links
 Profile - FSHF

1985 births
Living people
People from Krujë
Albanian footballers
Association football midfielders
KS Burreli players
FC Kamza players
FK Dinamo Tirana players
KF Adriatiku Mamurrasi players
KS Iliria players
Besëlidhja Lezhë players
KS Turbina Cërrik players
KS Kastrioti players
Kategoria Superiore players
Kategoria e Parë players